The Nottoway Indian Tribe of Virginia is a state-recognized tribe and nonprofit organization in Virginia. The organization identifies as descending from Nottoway people. They are not federally recognized as a Native American tribe.

State-recognition 
The Commonwealth of Virginia recognized the Nottoway Indian Tribe of Virginia as a tribe in 2010. The state also recognized the Cheroenhaka (Nottoway) Indian Tribe.

Organization 
The group formed Nottoway Indian Tribe of Virginia, Inc., a 501(c)(3) nonprofit organization in 2006.

The agent for the organization is Crystal Joyner of Franklin, Virginia. The administration includes:
 Director: Archie Elliot, Lynnetter Lewis Allston
 Chair: Lynnette Lewis Allston
 Vice-chair: Archie Elliot
 Officer: Asphy S. Turner, William Wright.

In 2009, they organized the Virginia Nottoway Indian Circle and Square Foundation Incorporated, another nonprofit organization based in King William, Virginia. Their principal officer Asphy S. Turner.

Lynette Lewis Allston is the chief of the state-recognized tribe, based in Capron, Virginia.

Activity 
Nottoway Indian Tribe of Virginia host an annual powwow in Surry, Virginia.

Notes

External links
 

Cultural organizations based in Virginia
Non-profit organizations based in Virginia
State-recognized tribes in the United States
2006 establishments in Virginia
2009 establishments in Virginia